Hedrich Blessing Photographers (also Hedrich-Blessing) was an architectural photography firm established in Chicago in 1929 by partners Ken Hedrich and Henry Blessing. The Chicago History Museum houses the archive of the first 50 years of photography (1929–1979), where it is available for viewing by the public.  Hedrich Blessing collaborated with architects and designers both nationally and internationally but also undertook non-architectural work; industrial, product, editorial, and corporate photography.

History 
The firm was founded by 21 year old photographer Ken Hedrich, who had studied his craft at the New York Institute of Photography, and his business partner Henry Blessing. Blessing left the business in 1931 but it retained its name Hedrich-Blessing with its new partners being two of Ken Hedrich’s brothers, Ed and Bill Hedrich who joined the firm in 1930 and 1931 respectively. They were later joined by their youngest brother Jack Hedrich who was an administrator and president for 40 odd years.

“Don’t make photographs, think them” was a pronouncement by Ken Hedrich that became the motto of the firm which became famous for its innovative architectural photographs capturing the spirit of buildings. As Jack Hedrich said '”They were really the first ones to change architectural photography from reporting images to artistic images”. In 1937, Architectural Forum commissioned Hedrich-Blessing to photograph recent works of Frank Lloyd Wright and Ken and Bill Hedrich formed a lifelong association with Wright. The studio became associated with documenting the modern architecture movement, for example, the work of Ludwig Mies Van Der Rohe, Albert Kahn, Buckminster Fuller, Eero Saarinen, Minoru Yamasaki, Harry Weese and Skidmore, Owings & Merrill.

Hedrich-Blessing remained a family-run business until the retirement of Jim Hedrich, son of Ken Hedrich, in 2003. The studio finally closed in 2017 when two of the firm’s principal photographers formed Hall + Merrick Photographers which now trades under the name of Hall + Merrick + McCaugherty.

As well as the large archive of photographs owned by the Chicago Historical Society and housed at the Chicago History Museum, photographs are also held in the photographic archive of The University of Chicago, the Prints and Photographs Division, Library of Congress, Washington, D.C. and in the Conway Library, The Courtauld Institute of Art, London.

List of Photographers 

Listed in chronological order including time on camera.

 Ken Hedrich, 1929–1971
 Bill Hedrich, 1931–1988
 Giovanni Suter, 1938–1972
 Hube Henry, 1945–1964
 Bill Engdahl, 1948–1985
 Bob Harr, 1952–2008
 Jim Hedrich, 1966–2005
 Bob Porth, 1968–1988
 Bob Shimer, 1969–2008
 Nick Merrick, 1977–2017
 Jon Miller, 1979–2017
 Sandi Hedrich, 1981–1988
 Scott McDonald, 1983–2015
 Marco Lorenzetti, 1985–1998
 Steve Hall, 1985–2017
 Chris Barrett, 1991–2008
 Craig Dugan, 1993–2009
 Jeff Millies, 1998-2008
 Dave Burk, 2009–2015
 Tom Harris 2012-2015

Presidents 
Listed chronologically and with dates of tenure.

 Ed Hedrich 1931-1976
 Jack Hedrich 1953-1993
 Mike Houlahan 1986-2004
 Nick Merrick 2004-2010
 Jon Miller 2010–2016
 Steve Hall 2016–2017

Publications 
The Architectural Photography of Hedrich-Blessing, edited and with an introduction by Robert A. Sobieszek, Holt, Rinehart and Winston (1984)   
Building Images : Seventy Years of Photography at Hedrich Blessing, essay by Tony Hiss; introduction by Timothy Samuelson, Chronicle Books (2000)

Building images 
In 2000-2001 the Chicago History Museum held an exhibition displaying images from the first 70 years of architectural photography from Hedrich Blessing.  The exhibition drew from over 400,000 prints and negatives from more than 40,000 assignments spanning 7 decades.

Selection of other exhibitions 

 1987 Hedrich-Blessing Architectural Photography, images from the 1930s and `40s, Edwynn Houk Gallery, Chicago
 2008 Hedrich Blessing Interiors: Architectural Photography of the 1930s, ArchiTech Gallery
 2021 Hedrich Blessing Photographers‘ new exhibition, entitled “Building on Tradition,” at the bulthaup Chicago showroom, showcasing a collection of the studio’s recent architecture and interior design photographs by Dave Burk, Steve Hall, Tom Harris, Scott McDonald, Nick Merrick, and Jon Miller

References

External links 
 Hedrich Blessing Photographers' Official Website
 University of Chicago Archival Photographic Files
  Chicago History Museum Hedrich-Blessing Photograph Collection Part I
  Chicago History Museum Hedrich-Blessing Photography Collection Part II
  Chicago History Museum Hedrich-Blessing Office Files

Companies based in Chicago
Photography curators
Architectural photographers